Muslih Al-Ikhlas may refer to:

Muṣliḥ al-Dīn bin Abdallāh Shīrāzī, known as Saadi (1184 – c. 1283), Persian poet
Kurtoğlu Muslihiddin Reis (1487 – c. 1535), Turkish privateer and Ottoman admiral
Muhammad Muslehuddin Siddiqui (1918–1983), Sufi leader of Hyderabad (India)
Muslehuddin (composer) (1932–2003), Pakistani film composer, music director